"I Won't Forget You" is a single by American singer Jim Reeves. It was released in 1964 by RCA Victor and peaked at number three on the UK Singles Chart. It was the 56th biggest-selling single in the United Kingdom during the 1960s.

Track listing
"I Won't Forget You"
"A Stranger's Just a Friend"

Chart performance

References

Jim Reeves songs
1964 singles
RCA Victor singles
1964 songs
Songs written by Harlan Howard